The Sibișel is a right tributary of the Râul Mare in Romania. It discharges into the Râul Mare in Sântămăria-Orlea. It starts at the confluence of headwaters Stânișoara and Pietrele in the Retezat Mountains.

References

Rivers of Romania
Rivers of Hunedoara County